Pseudocnemodus is a genus of dirt-colored seed bugs in the family Rhyparochromidae. There is one described species in Pseudocnemodus, P. canadensis.

References

Rhyparochromidae
Articles created by Qbugbot